An Oversimplification of Her Beauty is a 2012 American semi-animated comedy-drama-romance film, directed by Terence Nance in his feature directorial debut. The film follows a quixotic artist who, when stood up by an attractive woman, makes a film about it and shows it to her.  The film was adapted from Nance's 2006 short film, How Would You Feel?. It premiered at the 2012 Sundance Film Festival and has received generally positive reviews from critics.

Synopsis
A young man (Terence Nance) is stood up on a date by a beautiful woman (Namik Minter), he begins to wonder about the nature of feelings and what exactly makes up a specific moment in time.

Cast
Terence Nance as Terence
Alisa Becher
Jc Cain
Dexter Jones
Namik Minter
Talibah Lateefah Newman
Chanelle Aponte Pearson

Reception
Critical reception for An Oversimplification of Her Beauty has been mostly positive and the film holds a rating of 74 on Metacritic (based on 11 reviews) and a rating of 82% on Rotten Tomatoes (based on 38 reviews).

Awards
Best Film Not Playing at a Theater Near You at the Gotham Independent Film Awards (2012, won)

See also

Afrofuturism in film
List of black films of the 2010s

References

External links
 
 
 
 
 

2012 films
Afrofuturist films
American romantic comedy-drama films
2012 animated films
2012 independent films
2012 romantic comedy-drama films
American avant-garde and experimental films
African-American films
American independent films
2010s American animated films
Variance Films films
2010s avant-garde and experimental films
2012 comedy films
2012 drama films
2010s English-language films